A friar is a member of one of the mendicant orders founded in the twelfth or thirteenth century; the term distinguishes the mendicants' itinerant apostolic character, exercised broadly under the jurisdiction of a superior general, from the older monastic orders' allegiance to a single monastery formalized by their vow of stability. A friar may be in holy orders or a brother. The most significant orders of friars are the Dominicans, Franciscans, Augustinians, and Carmelites.

Definition
Friars are different from monks in that they are called to the great evangelical counsels (vows of poverty, chastity, and obedience) in service to society, rather than through cloistered asceticism and devotion. Whereas monks live in a self-sufficient community, friars work among laypeople and are supported by donations or other charitable support. Monks or nuns make their vows and commit to a particular community in a particular place. Friars commit to a community spread across a wider geographical area known as a province and so they will typically move around, spending time in different houses of the community within their province.

Etymology
The English term friar is derived from the Norman French word frere (brother), from the Latin frater (brother), which was widely used in the Latin New Testament to refer to members of the Christian community. Fray is sometimes used in Spain and former Spanish colonies such as the Philippines or the American Southwest as a title, such as in Fray Juan de Torquemada.

Orders

In the Roman Catholic Church, there are two classes of orders known as friars, or mendicant orders: the four great orders and the so-called lesser orders.

Major orders
The four great orders were mentioned by the Second Council of Lyons (1274):

 The Carmelites, founded  1155. They are also known as the White Friars because of the white cloak which covers their brown habit. They received papal approval from Honorius III in 1226 and later by Innocent IV in 1247. The Carmelites were founded as a purely contemplative order, but became mendicants in 1245. There are two types of Carmelites, those of the Ancient Observance (O.Carm.) and those of the Discalced Carmelites (O.C.D.), founded by St. Teresa of Ávila in the 16th century. 

 The Franciscans, founded in 1209. They are also known as the Friars Minor. The Franciscans were founded by St. Francis of Assisi and received oral papal approval by Innocent III in 1209 and formal papal confirmation by Honorius III in 1223. Today the Friars Minor is composed of three branches: the Order of Friars Minor (Brown Franciscans), Order of Friars Minor Capuchin (Brown Friars with long pointed hoods) and the Order of Friars Minor Conventual wearing grey or black habits (thus known as Grey Friars). In the Franciscan order, a friar may be an ordained priest or a non-ordained brother.
 The Dominicans, founded  1216. They are also known as the Friar Preachers or the Black Friars from the black mantle (cappa) worn over their white habit. The Dominicans were founded by St. Dominic and received papal approval from Honorius III in 1216 as the Ordo Praedicatorum under the Rule of St. Augustine. They became a mendicant order in 1221.
 The Augustinians, founded in 1244 (the "Little Union") and enlarged in 1256 (the Grand Union). They are also known as the Hermits of St. Augustine or the Austin Friars. Their rule is based on the writings of Augustine of Hippo. The Augustinians were assembled from various groups of hermits as a mendicant order by Pope Innocent IV in 1244 (Little Union). Additional groups were added by Alexander IV in 1256 (Grand Union).

Lesser orders
Some of the lesser orders are: 
 the Trinitarians, established in 1198
 the Mercedarians, established in 1218
 the Servites, established in 1240
 the Minims, established in 1474
 the Third Order Regular of St. Francis, a branch of the Third Order of St. Francis, part of the Franciscan Order established in 1447
 the Discalced Carmelites, established in 1568 
 the Order of Augustinian Recollects, established in 1598 through the Chapter of Toledo
 the Discalced Trinitarians, established in 1599
 the Order of Penance, established in 1781

Order of Malta
In the Sovereign Military Order of Malta the term Fra' (an abbreviation for the Latin word "frater" meaning "brother") is used when addressing the professed Knights of Justice who have taken vows.

Uses by other Christian traditions
Orders of friars (and sisters) exist in other Christian traditions, including the Order of Lutheran Franciscans, the Order of Ecumenical Franciscans and the Order of Lesser Sisters and Brothers. In the Anglican Communion there are also a number of mendicant groups such as the Anglican Friars Preachers, the Society of Saint Francis and the Order of St Francis.

Other usage of the term
Several high schools, as well as Providence College, use friars as their school mascot.  

The Major League Baseball team San Diego Padres have the Swinging Friar ("padre" is also a Spanish word for the priestly title "father"; in 1769 San Diego was founded by Spanish Franciscan friars under Junípero Serra).

The University of Michigan's oldest a cappella group is a male octet known as The Friars.

The University of Pennsylvania has a senior honor society known as Friars.

Sports teams at Father Dueñas Memorial School on the island of Guam are known as the Friars.

See also
 Brother (Catholic)
 Dervish
 Priesthood (Catholic Church)
 Sadhu

References

Christian religious occupations
Catholicism in the Middle Ages